Campani may refer to:

Places 
 Câmpani, a commune in Bihor County, Romania

People 
 Campani or Campanians, an ancient Italic people of Oscan origin settled in the area of Capua
 Campani, the inhabitants of the modern Italian Region of Campania, around Naples
 Al Campanis (Alessandro Campani, 1916–1998), Italian-born American baseball player and general manager
 Fabrizio Campani (also Fabrizio Capanus, died 1605), Italian Roman Catholic Bishop of Ferentino 
 Giovanni Antonio Campani, called Campanus (1429–1477), Neapolitan-born humanist, protégé of Cardinal Bessarion
 Giuseppe Campani (1635–1715), Italian optician and astronomer
 Luca Campani (born 1990), Italian professional basketball player
 Matteo Campani-Alimenis or Mathieu Campani-Alimenis (17th century), Italian mechanician and natural philosopher

Other uses 
 Campani compound microscope, on exhibit at the Museo Galileo in Italy, formerly attributed to Galileo Galilei